The 2002 Women's Six Nations Championship was the first series of the rugby union Women's Six Nations Championship and was won by , who achieved the Grand Slam.

Table

Results

See also
Women's Six Nations Championship
Women's international rugby union

References

External links
The official RBS Six Nations Site

2002
2001–02 in Irish rugby union
2001–02 in English rugby union
2001–02 in Welsh rugby union
2001–02 in Scottish rugby union
2001–02 in French rugby union
2001–02 in European women's rugby union
rugby union
rugby union
rugby union
rugby union
2001–02 in Spanish rugby union
International women's rugby union competitions hosted by Spain
Women
rugby union
rugby union
Women's Six Nations
Women's Six Nations
Women's Six Nations